56th Street  may refer to:
56th Street (Manhattan) in New York City
56th Street in Tsawwassen, British Columbia, the only land connection between Point Roberts, Washington and the rest of North America